Sycon yatsui is a species of calcareous sponge belonging to the family Sycettidae. The scientific name of the species was first published in 1929.

References

Leucosolenida
Sponges described in 1929